John Scagliotti is an American film director and producer, and radio broadcaster. He has received honors for his work on documentaries about LGBT issues including Before Stonewall and After Stonewall.

Biography
During the 1970s, Scagliotti was the News and Public Affairs Director of WBCN/104.1 in Boston. For his work in radio, he was awarded two Major Armstrong Awards. In the early 1980s, Scagliotti attended New York University Film School. He created In the Life for PBS. This was the United States' first gay and lesbian national series.  The Scagliotti-produced 1985 documentary film Before Stonewall won the Audience Award at L.A. Outfest and two Emmy Awards. Scagliotti directed a companion piece, After Stonewall.  The film won a Golden Eagle and the Audience Award at the Los Angeles Gay and Lesbian Film Festival. Scagliotti is openly gay. His partner for 24 years was the late journalist Andrew Kopkind. Together they produced the radio show The Lavender Hour.

Filmography
1984: Before Stonewall (Producer)
1999: After Stonewall
2003: Dangerous Living: Coming Out in the Developing World
2017: Before Homosexuals — a prequel to Before Stonewall

References

External links

American people of Italian descent
American radio personalities
Gay entertainers
LGBT film directors
American LGBT broadcasters
LGBT producers
Living people
Tisch School of the Arts alumni
Year of birth missing (living people)